"Augen auf" is a song by German recording artist Sarah Connor. It was written and produced by Connor along with Daniel Faust, Peter Plate, and Ulf Leo Sommer for her ninth studio album Muttersprache (2016).

Formats and track listings

Charts

References

External links
  
 

2010s ballads
2015 singles
2016 singles
2015 songs
German-language songs
Polydor Records singles
Sarah Connor (singer) songs
Songs written by Peter Plate
Songs written by Sarah Connor (singer)
Songs written by Ulf Leo Sommer